William Jennings Bryan unsuccessfully ran for president thrice:

 William Jennings Bryan presidential campaign, 1896
 William Jennings Bryan presidential campaign, 1900, the failed campaign William Jennings Bryan conducted in 1900
 William Jennings Bryan presidential campaign, 1908, the failed campaign William Jennings Bryan conducted in 1908